Cercospora vicosae is a fungal plant pathogen. It causes leaf spot on cassava.

References

External links 
 Index Fungorum
 USDA ARS Fungal Database

vicosae
Fungal plant pathogens and diseases
Eudicot diseases